Parapura is a 2014 Sri Lankan Sinhalese action thriller film directed by Cletus Mendis and co-produced by Cletus Mendis himself with Basil Jayasuriya and Srimali Jayasuriya. It stars Jeevan Kumaratunga, Ravindra Randeniya and Sanath Gunathilake along with Ranjan Ramanayake, Nita Fernando and Buddhadasa Vithanarachchi. It is the 1,209th Sri Lankan film in the Sinhala cinema. It was the first acting role for Dilantha Mendis and Jeevan Kumaratunga's daughter, Malsha Kumaratunga.

Cast
 Jeevan Kumaratunga as Suranimala; Madhawa, Kamal and Dilanga's father
 Ravindra Randeniya as a Parliament Minister Rajamanthri; A kind hearted minister who helped to people 
 Sanath Gunathilake as Minister Marasinghe; A criticism minister who abducted Dilanga
 Ranjan Ramanayake as Madhawa; Suranimala's first son who is a boxer like his father
 Dilhani Ekanayake as Sudharma; Madhawa, Kamal and Dilanga's mother
 Dilanga Mendis as Dilanga aka Suduputha; Suranimala's third son who had a wizarding power
 Kanchana Mendis as Chethana; Madhava's girlfriend
 Nita Fernando as Kanthi; Dilanga's adopted mother
 Tennyson Cooray as Dilanga's friend
 Ajith Rajapaksha as Tyrone; The main villain who tried to kill Dilanga
 Buddhadasa Vithanarachchi as Chethana's father
 Kumara Thirimadura as Dilanga's adopted father
 Palitha Silva as a Police officer Sathyapala
 Chillie Thilanka as Musician Kamal aka Mahathun; Suranimala's second son who escaped from home to be a musician
 Dinesh Subasinghe as Music director 
 Cletus Mendis as Senior Superintendent of Police (SSP)
 Wilson Karunaratne
 Denuwan Senadhi as Dilanga's friend
 Menaka Peries as Iresha
 Smanathi Lanaroul as Podi hamina
 Maureen Charuni as Chethana's mother
 Rajasinghe Loluwagoda as Photographer
 Malsha Kumaratunga
 Christeena Fernando
 Sarath Dikkumbura

References

2014 films
2010s Sinhala-language films